Dolf Niezen (14 February 1926 – 1 May 2020) was a Dutch footballer who played as a goalkeeper.

Career
Niezen joined ADO at the age of 9 and made his first-team debut at the age of 16. That season, in 1942 during World War II, the club became Dutch champion, making him the youngest goalkeeper to win the title. He made 97 league appearances for ADO between 1942 and 1949, before later playing for Quick.

Later life and death
He died on 1 May 2020, aged 94.

References

1926 births
2020 deaths
Dutch footballers
ADO Den Haag players
Eredivisie players
Association football goalkeepers
H.V. & C.V. Quick players